JII may refer to:
 -ji, an honorific suffix in Hindustani and other Indian languages
 Jakarta Islamic Index
 Jiiddu language
 John Innes Institute
 JPMorgan Indian Investment Trust
 Sinopterus jii, an extinct species of pterosaur
 Sinocyclocheilus jii, a species of ray-finned fish
 Albatros J.II, a World War I German biplane

See also 
 J11 (disambiguation)